is a special collaboration song between solo artist Chara and Judy and Mary vocalist Yuki. The song was used in a Sapporo Beer commercial for their  campaign.

The song was released as Chara's first single after her maternity leave for her second child, and while Yuki was taking a break from Judy and Mary activities (and participating in the band NiNa).

The song's title is a pun:  sounds like .

The song debuted at #6 on Oricon charts and charted for seven weeks, eventually selling approximately 230,000 copies.

Music video

The music video was shot by directorial pair Blaine & Justin. It begins in space, showing a moon superimposed with people on it. A blue man holds up a crescent-shaped hoop to the moon. The majority of the video is based around clips of Chara and Yuki are in red, glittery outfits, along with scenes of four blue dancers covered in lights.

Track listing

Single

Chart Rankings

Oricon Charts (Japan)

Various charts

References

Chara (singer) songs
1999 singles
Japanese-language songs
Songs written by Chara (singer)
1999 songs
Sony Music Entertainment Japan singles